ThermoSensor is a coin-sized battery-powered RFID-enabled temperature sensor which is to be attached to the lower abdomen of patients by using 3M Tegaderm for body temperature monitoring. ThermoSensor was invented by the company Cadi Scientific in 2003 in Singapore for body temperature monitoring but it was later used for location tracking of patients too.

References

Medical testing equipment